Keen is an Italian industrial metal band, originating from Sulmona, Italy, in February 2003. Keen are influenced by several industrial metal bands, such as Rammstein, The Kovenant and Marilyn Manson (whose tour "Against All Gods Tour" was opened by Keen in 2005), and metal bands including Metallica, but the Keen sound is a personal mix of melodies, aggressiveness, involving rhythms and electronic samplings; a result of the union of the different musical skills and interests of each member of the band.

In 2011, the band members included Cristian Esposito (Critz) and Gianni Buccigrossi (Shirley).

On August 23, 2003, Keen released their first self-produced EP, Love With Bile, preceded by the self-produced introduction single, "Nailing Keen", that the band released in April 2003. In mid-2003, Keen was selected by Rock TV between more than 4,000 bands to take part in I.TIM Tour Festival 2003. After they won the competition in Catania (one of the I.TIM Tour Festival 2003's date) Keen got to the finals at Piazza Duomo in Milan in front of 10,000 people. "Nailing Keen" was included in the magazine's Rock Hard number 17 CD-compilation album, released in December 2003.

On January 20, 2004, the band was involved in one episode of Salaprove, which went on the air on Rock TV and, in April, they shared the stage with Extrema for Rock TV Tour in Reggio Emilia. In March 2004, Rock Hard published the first interview of the band. Keen was selected again by Rock TV to take part in I.TIM Tour Festival 2004. After they won the competition in Reggio Calabria, Keen got to the finals at Piazza Duomo in Milan. The same year, Keen taken part in Database (Rock TV).

In June 2005, their song "Sleeping Beauty", was chosen to be the soundtrack for the short film, La bella Addormentata. The same month, Keen was chosen by Clear Channel/Universal Music Italia to share the stage with Marilyn Manson for the Italian date of Against All Gods Tour. In September, a Keen interview  was featured in Metal Shock magazine number 437 and the following month, Keen released the Dying Life EP.

In December 2006, Keen released the Dramas in Formaldheyde EP. "Stuntman" from Dramas In Formaldehyde was chosen as the soundtrack by the European Stuntman School for their shows. Keen were chosen by Myspace as one of the best nine underground European existing bands. In June 2007, Keen was selected to take part in Gods of Metal at Idroscalo in Milan.

In April 2009, Keen released Broken Hearts Museum. The band folded the same year.

Band members
Critz :: Guitars
Shirley :: Vox

Discography 
"Nailing Keen" (single), 2003
Love With Bile (EP), 2003
"Ars Amatoria" (single), 2004
Dying Life (EP), 2005
Dramas in Formaldehyde (EP), 2006
Broken Hearts Museum (EP), 2009

References

Italian heavy metal musical groups
Musical quintets
Musical groups established in 2003